The Stationery Office (TSO) is a British publishing company created in 1996 when the publishing arm of His Majesty's Stationery Office was privatised. It is the official publisher and the distributor for legislation, command and house papers, select committee reports, Hansard, and the London, Edinburgh and Belfast Gazettes, the UK government's three official journals of record. With more than 9,000 titles in print and digital formats published every year, it is one of the UK's largest publishers by volume.

TSO provides services, consultancy, and infrastructure to deliver all aspects of the information lifecycle. TSO developed the website legislation.gov.uk with The National Archives, providing full access to the statute book as open data.

The TSO OpenUp platform is a collection of integrated services available as software as a service (SaaS), with the aim of providing a scalable and resilient platform that allows organisations to store, query, and enrich their data.

History
The Stationery Office was sold for £54 million when it was privatised in 1996. Two thirds of TSO was purchased by Electra Fleming, an investment trust co-owned by Electra Investment and the investment bank Robert Fleming & Company. Three executives of TSO purchased large stakes in the business: Rupert Pennant-Rea purchased a 4.5 per cent stake, Bob Thian a 6 per cent stake, and Richard Martin 3 per cent stake.

In 1999, Electra Fleming sold TSO to its existing management team and Apax, a private equity firm, for £82 million. Rupert Pennant-Rea remained as chairman, and Fred Perkins stayed as chief executive. TSO was sold in 2006 to business process outsourcing company Williams Lea, of which a majority stake had been acquired by logistics company Deutsche Post earlier that year.

In 2014, TSO also began working with the local government sector, beginning with the redevelopment of the Croydon Council internal and external websites.

See also
Office of Public Sector Information
UK Parliament

References

External links
 

Book publishing companies of the United Kingdom
Companies based in Norwich
Companies based in the London Borough of Southwark
1996 establishments in the United Kingdom
Publishing companies established in 1996
Privatised executive agencies of the United Kingdom government